Justice Burch may refer to:

Allen Banks Burch (1894–1948), associate justice of the Kansas Supreme Court
Newton D. Burch (1871–1931), associate justice of the South Dakota Supreme Court
Rousseau Angelus Burch (1862–1944), associate justice of the Kansas Supreme Court

See also
A. A. Birch Jr. (1932–2011), chief justice of the Tennessee Supreme Court